Le Vert de Maisons is a railway station in Maisons-Alfort and Alfortville, Val-de-Marne, Île-de-France, France. The station was opened on 28 May 1955 and is on the Paris–Marseille railway. The station is served by Paris' express suburban rail system, the RER. In the future, Paris Metro Line 15 will stop here. The train services are operated by SNCF.

Train services
The station is served by the following service(s):

Local services (RER D) Paris–Villeneuve-Saint-Georges–Juvisy–Évry-Courcouronnes Centre–Corbeil Essonnes
Local services (RER D) Creil–Orry-la-Ville–Goussainville–Saint-Denis–Paris–Villeneuve-Saint-Georges–Juvisy–Évry–Corbeil Essonnes

See also 

 List of stations of the Paris RER

External links

 

Railway stations in Val-de-Marne
Réseau Express Régional stations
Railway stations in France opened in 1955